How Ethical is Australia? An Examination of Australia's Record as a Global Citizen  is a 2004 book by Peter Singer and Tom Gregg, in which the authors apply moral philosophy to examine Australia's domestic, environmental and foreign policies.

References

2004 non-fiction books
Books by Peter Singer
English-language books
Black Inc books